The Mataram dynasty is a reference to a dynasty or family that occupies the throne of the Mataram Sultanate. After the Javanese Revolutionary War in the 18th century to the present, the Mataram dynasty ruled the fragmented monarchs of the Mataram Sultanate (Catur Sagatra)

History 
The Giyanti Treaty divides the Mataram Sultanate into two; Surakarta Sunanate and Yogyakarta Sultanate.

According to the Babad Tanah Jawi, the House of Mataram is descended from Ki Ageng Sela through his grandson, Ki Ageng Pemanahan. The latter figure is the father of Panembahan Senopati, the first king of Mataram. Ki Ageng Sela himself is said to have descended from Brawijaya V, the last king of Majapahit.

After the Third Javanese War of Succession was over, three kingdoms were formed, two of which became full heirs of the Mataram Dynasty (Sultanate of Yogyakarta and Surakarta Sunanate). The third was known as the Duchy of Mangkunegaran. During the split of Mataram, Sultan Hamengkubuwono I, Susuhunan Pakubuwana III, and Duke Mangkunegara I were all siblings. When the British came to power in Java, Raffles installed Prince Natakusuma, son of Sultan Hamengkubuwana I, as an independent prince who ruled a new imperial monarchy, the Pakualaman Duchy, as a repayment for his assistance in helping the resistance of the Sultanate of Yogyakarta against British rule.

Indonesian National Heroes from the Mataram Dynasty 

 Sultan Agung Anyakrakusuma
 Susuhunan Pakubuwana VI
 Susuhunan Pakubuwana X
 Susuhunan Pakubuwana XII
 Sultan Hamengkubuwana I
 Sultan Hamengkubuwana IX
 Duke of Mangkunegara I
 BPH. Diponegoro (Pangeran Diponegoro)
 Jend. (Retired) GPH. Jatikusumo
 R.Ay. Hj. Siti Hartinah
 R.M. Suwardi Suryaningrat (Ki Hajar Dewantara)
 R.M. Suryopranoto

Family Tree of the Mataram Dynasty

See also 

 Hamengkubuwana
 Mangkunegara

Indonesian royalty